In geometry, the great hexagonal hexecontahedron (or great astroid ditriacontahedron) is a nonconvex isohedral polyhedron. It is the dual of the uniform great snub dodecicosidodecahedron. It is partially degenerate, having coincident vertices, as its dual has coplanar pentagrammic faces.

Proportions

The faces are nonconvex hexagons. They have two long edges, two of medium length and two short ones. If the long edges have length , the medium ones have length  and the short ones . The dihedral angle equals .

References

External links 
 

Dual uniform polyhedra